Cesare da Sesto (1477–1523) was an Italian painter of the Renaissance active in Milan and elsewhere in Italy.

Life 
Cesare da Sesto was born in Sesto Calende, Lombardy. He is considered one of the Leonardeschi or artists influenced by Leonardo da Vinci, such as Bernardino Luini and Marco d'Oggiono. He may have trained or worked with Baldassare Peruzzi in Rome in 1505. Of this period, a lunette in Sant'Onofrio and some paintings in Campagnano Romano are attributed to him.

From 1514 he sojourned in Naples for six years. In 1515 he finished a monumental polyptych for the Abbey of Santissima Trinità at Cava de' Tirreni and produced Leda and the Swan, a copy after Leonardo's own work on the subject. Back in Milan, he executed a Baptism of Christ, in collaboration with Bernardino Bernazzano (now lost) and a Salomè, acquired by Rudolf II and now at the Kunsthistorisches Museum of Vienna. In 1517 he returned to southern Italy; in Messina executed an Adoration of the Kings which influenced numerous artists of southern Italy, it can be found in the Capodimonte Museum of Naples. Sometime between 1516 and 1519, he completed his Adoration of the Magi. 

He returned to Milan in 1520, where he painted the Madonna in Glory with Saints polyptych for the church of San Rocco (now in the Castello Sforzesco). He died in Milan in 1523.

References

Sources

External links

Leonardo da Vinci: anatomical drawings from the Royal Library, Windsor Castle, an exhibition catalog from The Metropolitan Museum of Art (fully available online as PDF), which contains material on da Sesto (see index)
Painters of reality : the legacy of Leonardo and Caravaggio in Lombardy, an exhibition catalog from The Metropolitan Museum of Art (fully available online as PDF), which contains material on da Sesto (see index)

1477 births
1523 deaths
People from the Province of Varese
15th-century Italian painters
Italian male painters
16th-century Italian painters
Italian Renaissance painters
Painters from Milan
Pupils and followers of Leonardo da Vinci